HOM, Hom or similar may refer to:

Places 
Le Hom, former name of the commune Thury-Harcourt-le-Hom in France
Hom, Šentrupert, a dispersed settlement in Slovenia
Hom-e Khosrow, a village in Iran

Science and mathematics 
Hom bundle, in topology
Hom functor, in category theory
, the set of linear forms from a vector space to its field
Higher-order modulation, in telecommunications
Hong–Ou–Mandel effect in quantum optics

Other uses 
Hom (surname), a Danish, Dutch, English, and Taishanese surname
Hom (instrument), a class of traditional Mayan musical instruments
H0m scale, a model railway scale or gauge
Hall of mirrors effect, in computer graphics
Harm to ongoing matter, phrase used for class of material being redacted from the Mueller Report, for reasons of legal investigation
Head of mission, the head of a diplomatic representation
Heart of Midlothian F.C., an association football club in Scotland
Heart of Misery, a song by Finnish rock band The Rasmus
Ho Man Tin station, Hong Kong, MTR station code
Holland (Amtrak station), in Michigan, United States
Homa language, spoken in South Sudan
Homa (ritual), in Hinduism
Homer Airport in Homer, Alaska
House of Milan, an American publisher of bondage magazines
Armenian Relief Society (Armenian: , HOM)
His Orthodox Majesty, a title occasionally used by kings in Poland
HOM, a luxury men's underwear brand owned by Triumph International

See also 
Homs (disambiguation)